Pensham is a small village located a mile or so from Pershore in Worcestershire, England.

Pensham is surrounded on three sides by a loop of the River Avon, despite the proximity of the river Pensham has no records of ever being flooded.

Pensham no longer has a pub or shop, but since 2000 there has been a village field after some of the residents raised enough funds to buy a couple of acres of land.  This has since been planted to provide a wooded area and an orchard area, with an open area between for village functions and sports. Pensham is a quiet area to live and any noise that is heard is often a tractor or a dog barking. There are many tracks to walk and from time to time ramblers visit the village.

External links 

Villages in Worcestershire
Pershore